, sometimes called Kokuraminami Airport, is an airport in Kokuraminami-ku, Kitakyushu, Fukuoka, Japan. It opened on 16 March 2006, as  but was renamed in 2008. It is designated a second class airport, and it has some international charter flights.

It is the fourth airport in Japan to begin operating 24 hours a day, after New Chitose Airport (Sapporo), Kansai International Airport (Osaka), and Chūbu Centrair International Airport (Nagoya).

History
The former Kitakyushu Airport had restrictions on aircraft operation due to its small size and location, close to mountains and residential areas. Heavy fog often resulted in flight cancellations. There were similar problems at the nearby Fukuoka Airport, which cannot engage in nighttime operations due to proximity to residential areas.

A new airport was intended to be free from such problems due to its offshore location, making possible 24-hour operation. Large cargo planes can use the airport, making possible convenient freight movement to and from nearby industrial zones. Toyota has a factory just across the bay from the airport.

Construction
A committee to promote the construction of the new airport was founded in 1978, with the governor of Fukuoka as chairman. Construction began in October 1994.

The new airport was anticipated by residents in and around the cities of Kitakyushu and Shimonoseki. The Kitakyushu municipal government organized bus tours to the construction site for interested citizens in an attempt to defuse controversy over the construction. The airport officially opened on March 16, 2006.

Flights

The first aircraft to land at the airport was a StarFlyer Airbus on March 26, 2006. The first international flight from Shanghai landed on March 30, 2006. A Korean low-cost carrier, Jeju Air, flew eight charter flights from Kitakyushu to Incheon International Airport in summer 2008. Scheduled service on the route started in March 2009.

Events
Several events were held to commemorate the opening of the airport. A marathon was held on February 5, 2006 with half-marathon, 10 kilometre and five kilometre courses to celebrate the opening of the new airport. On June 4, 2006, a rugby game was played at Honjo Stadium between Japan and Tonga as part of the inaugural IRB Pacific 5 Nations series.

On August 2, 2006, the one-millionth user of the airport was presented with souvenirs. By July 11, 2007, 3 million passengers had used the airport.

Dimensions

Airlines and destinations

Passenger

Cargo

Other facilities

The airline StarFlyer has its head office on the airport property.

Statistics

Access

Road
A 2.1 km toll-free bridge connects the island to the Higashikyūshū Expressway via the Kanda-Kitakyushukūkō interchange.

Bus

References

External links 

Official website
Official website 
 

Airports in Kyushu
Buildings and structures in Kitakyushu
Artificial islands of Japan
Transport in Fukuoka Prefecture
Artificial island airports
Airports established in 2006
2006 establishments in Japan